The 1966 United States Senate election in Alabama was held on November 8, 1966. 
Incumbent Senator John Sparkman was re-elected to a fourth term in office over Republican John Grenier.

Democratic primary

Candidates
 John G. Crommelin, retired U.S. Navy Rear Admiral and white supremacist
 Frank E. Dixon, Huntsville engineer
 John Sparkman, incumbent Senator
 Margaret E. Stewart, genealogist and historian

Campaign
This was the first Alabama election since Reconstruction to be regulated by federal elections observers, who were sent by the Department of Justice to ensure compliance with the Voting Rights Act.

Results

Independents and third parties

Third Party
 Julian Elgin, Republican nominee for Senate in 1960

General election

Results

See also 
 1966 United States Senate elections

References 

1966
Alabama
United States Senate